Tithraustes is a genus of moths of the family Notodontidae described by Herbert Druce in 1885.

Selected species

Tithraustes albinigra Warren, 1905
Tithraustes caliginosa (Dognin, 1902)
Tithraustes deiphon H. Druce, 1885
Tithraustes esernius (H. Druce, 1885)
Tithraustes haemon H. Druce, 1885
Tithraustes lambertae Miller, 2008
Tithraustes moerens Warren, 1900
Tithraustes noctiluces (Butler, 1872)
Tithraustes pyrifera Dognin, 1911
Tithraustes quinquepunctata Warren, 1901
Tithraustes seminigrata Warren, 1901
Tithraustes snyderi Miller, 2008

References

Notodontidae of South America